In mathematics, physics, and theoretical computer graphics, tapering is a kind of shape deformation. Just as an affine transformation, such as scaling or shearing, is a first-order model of shape deformation, tapering is a higher order deformation just as twisting and bending. Tapering can be thought of as non-constant scaling by a given tapering function. The resultant deformations can be linear or nonlinear.

To create a nonlinear taper, instead of scaling in x and y for all z with constants as in:

 

let a and b be functions of z so that:

 

As another example, if the parametric equation of a cube were given by ƒ(t) = (x(t), y(t), z(t)), a nonlinear taper could be applied so that the cube's volume slowly decreases (or tapers) as the function moves in the positive z direction. For the given cube, an example of a nonlinear taper along z would be if, for instance, the function T(z) = 1/(a + bt) were applied to the cube's equation such that ƒ(t) = (T(z)x(t), T(z)y(t), T(z)z(t)), for some real constants a and b.

See also
3D projection

References

External links
 , Computer Graphics Notes. University of Toronto. (See: Tapering).
 , 3D Transformations. Brown University. (See: Nonlinear deformations).
 , ScienceWorld article on Tapering in Image Synthesis.

Linear algebra
Functions and mappings